Albert Chemutai (born 25 November 1999) is a Ugandan runner competing in the 3000 metres steeplechase. He represented his country at the 2017 World Championships finishing tenth in the final.

He competed at the 2020 Summer Olympics.

International competitions

Personal bests
Outdoor
1500 metres – 3:43.97 (Modena 2018)
3000 metres – 8:04.67 (Marina di Carrara 2017)
5000 metres – 13:56.93 (Arezzo 2017)
3000 metres steeplechase – 8:12.29 (Monaco 2019)
Indoor
1500 metres – 3:56.25 (Firenze 2017)
3000 metres – 7:57.79 (Metz 2018)

References

1999 births
Living people
Ugandan male steeplechase runners
Athletes (track and field) at the 2018 Commonwealth Games
World Athletics Championships athletes for Uganda
Commonwealth Games competitors for Uganda
Athletes (track and field) at the 2020 Summer Olympics
Olympic athletes of Uganda
21st-century Ugandan people